The McCloud River redband trout (Oncorhynchus mykiss stonei) is one of three redband trout subspecies of the rainbow trout in the family Salmonidae. The trout is native in small tributaries of the McCloud River and Pit River which are tributaries of California's Sacramento River. Its historic range has declined significantly since it was first described in 1894.  Remaining populations of genetically pure McCloud River redband trout are threatened by predation, habitat loss, competition with introduced trout species and by hybridization with hatchery rainbow trout introduced to support sport fishing .

Historic influence on hatchery rainbow trout
In 1877, the second California rainbow trout hatchery and the first federal fish hatchery in the National Fish Hatchery System, was established on Campbell Creek, a McCloud River tributary. The McCloud River hatchery indiscriminately mixed coastal rainbow trout (O. m. irideus) eggs with the eggs of local McCloud River redband trout . Eggs from the McCloud hatchery were also provided to the San Leandro hatchery, thus making the origin and genetic history of hatchery-bred rainbow trout somewhat diverse and complex. Rainbow trout eggs and fry from these two hatcheries were the original source of most artificially propagated rainbow trout in the world.

Notes

Oncorhynchus
Trout, McCloud
Trout, McCloud
Trout, McCloud
Pit River
Natural history of the California Coast Ranges
Natural history of the Central Valley (California)
Natural history of Shasta County, California
Natural history of Siskiyou County, California
Shasta-Trinity National Forest
Fauna without expected TNC conservation status